Stormforce 10 is a ride that recreates the story of a lifeboat rescue, launched in association with the RNLI. The ride is located at Drayton Manor Resort near Tamworth, Staffordshire, England. the height and age restrictions are; 1.3m and 14+ to ride alone

Ride experience
The ride begins with the boat being sent into the launch area where a canopy closes behind. A lifeguard figure to the left of the boat shines a torch in his eyes and says “Hold On Tight Now! Here Ya Go!” as the boat tilts upwards. He will then push a lever which then sends the boat 10 ft into the water below, slightly soaking those in the front.( From 2007-2010 & as of 2021 the boats are launched manually) The boat then goes around a waterfall-like structure before climbing 9m up the next hill. At the top, the boat is placed on a turntable that sends it in to a backwards drop segment, which is notorious for drenching riders. The boat goes around a second turntable which turns the ride forwards again, and then goes through a themed tunnel before going back outside where the boat climbs a 60-foot hill. At the top, riders are given views of the whole park, before turning towards the lake where the final and largest drop occurs. The drop itself is a doubledrop, offering airtime and it gives a large spectacular splash then slowly climbs the last hill back into the station.

Water rides
Amusement rides introduced in 1999